Brittney Page (born 4 February 1984) is a Canadian female volleyball player. She is a member of the Canada women's national volleyball team and played for SC Potsdam in 2014. She was part of the Canadian national team at the 2014 FIVB Volleyball Women's World Championship in Italy.

Clubs
  SC Potsdam (2014)

References

External links
http://olympic.ca/team-canada/brittney-page/
http://italy2014.fivb.org/en/competition/teams/can-canada/players/brittney-page?id=41381

1984 births
Living people
Canadian women's volleyball players
Sportspeople from Kelowna
Volleyball players at the 2015 Pan American Games
Pan American Games competitors for Canada
Wing spikers
Expatriate volleyball players in Germany
Expatriate volleyball players in Austria
Expatriate volleyball players in Spain
Expatriate volleyball players in Finland
Expatriate volleyball players in Belgium
Canadian expatriate sportspeople in Austria
Canadian expatriate sportspeople in Germany
Canadian expatriate sportspeople in Spain
Canadian expatriate sportspeople in Finland
Canadian expatriate sportspeople in Belgium
Expatriate volleyball players in the United States
Canadian expatriate sportspeople in the United States
Eastern Washington University alumni